The Best of the Vanguard Years is a compilation album by American folk singer Odetta, originally released in 1999.

The focus of the material is the music Odetta performed when recording for the Vanguard label.

Track listing
All songs Traditional unless otherwise noted.
"Midnight Special" – 3:21
"Cotton Fields" (Lead Belly) – 3:21
"Special Delivery Blues" – 2:37
"Rambling Round Your City" (Woody Guthrie) – 4:02
"Cool Water" (Bob Nolan) – 3:04
"Down on Me" – 2:55
"I've Been Driving on Bald Mountain/Water Boy" (Robinson) – 6:53
"Saro Jane" – 2:46
"Battle Hymn of the Republic" (Julia Ward Howe) – 3:51
"If I Had a Hammer" (Lee Hays, Pete Seeger) – 1:53
"Joshua Fit the Battle of Jericho" – 2:20
"Meetin' at the Building" – 2:35
"No More Auction Block" – 2:17
"Sometimes I Feel Like a Motherless Child" – 3:22
"Spoken Introduction: He Had a Long Chain On" (Jimmy Driftwood) – 6:22
"Another Man Done Gone" (Vera Hall, Alan Lomax, John Lomax, Ruby Pickens Tartt) – 2:31
"He's Got the Whole World in His Hands" – 2:05
"Make Me a Pallet on the Floor" – 3:21
"Livin' with the Blues" – 3:39
"Nobody Knows You When You're Down and Out" (Cox) – 2:12
"House of the Rising Sun" – 3:14

Personnel
Odetta – vocals, guitar
Bill Lee – bass
Milt Okun – conductor

Production notes
Samuel Charters – compilation liner notes
David Gahr –  photography
Jeff Zaraya – engineer

Odetta compilation albums
1999 compilation albums
Vanguard Records compilation albums